Rohri Junction railway station is located in Rohri, Sukkur district of Sindh province, Pakistan. It is a major railway station on the Pakistan Railways network, serving as the junction between the Karachi–Peshawar Railway Line and Rohri-Chaman Railway Line. The station serves as a stop of all express trains. The station is staffed and has advance and current reservation offices. Food stalls are also located on its platforms. The land of the station is taken on lease for 100 years from Nawab Mir Yakoob Ali Shah.

Train routes
The routes are Rohri from linked to Karachi, Lahore, Rawalpindi, Peshawar, Quetta, Multan, Faisalabad, Sargodha, Jhang, Hyderabad, Sukkur, Rahim Yar Khan, Bahawalpur, Gujrat, Gujranwala, Khanewal, Nawabshah, Larkana, Sibi, Attock and Nowshera

Services
The following trains stop at Rohri Junction station:

Workshop
A railway workshop is located near the station, which is locally known as Loco Shed. It is used to clean carriages of the railway, maintenance of engines, and related work.

See also
 List of railway stations in Pakistan
 Pakistan Railways

References

Railway stations in Sukkur District
Railway stations on Rohri–Chaman Railway Line
Railway stations on Karachi–Peshawar Line (ML 1)
Railway stations in Sindh